Black on White is a 1943 comedy film directed by E. W. Emo.

Cast

References

External links 

1943 films
1943 comedy films
German comedy films
Films of Nazi Germany
Films directed by E. W. Emo
Films scored by Nico Dostal
German black-and-white films
1940s German-language films
1940s German films